Kiminini is a constituency in Kenya. It is one of five constituencies in Trans-Nzoia County.

Members of Parliament

References 

Constituencies in Trans-Nzoia County